Miami Valley Gaming is a harness racing track and casino (a "racino") in Turtlecreek Township, Ohio. It opened in 2013 as a replacement for Lebanon Raceway, located in nearby Lebanon. The track conducts seasonal live racing on Friday and Saturday nights as well as Sunday, Monday and Tuesday afternoons.  The track offers simulcasting from North American harness tracks seven days a week.

After Governor John Kasich approved video lottery terminals at Ohio racetracks in 2011, a joint venture of Churchill Downs Inc. and Delaware North Companies agreed in March 2012 to buy Lebanon Raceway from the Nixon and Carlo families for $60 million, and planned to transfer its license to a new $215-million racino to be built several miles away. The purchase was completed in December 2012. The casino at the new location opened on December 12, 2013. In 2017, Miami Valley Gaming spent $5 million on expansion, adding new patio and high limit areas.

In November 2020, during the COVID-19 pandemic in Ohio, the Miami Valley Gaming announced that they would change their operating hours due to the statewide curfew imposed by Governor Mike DeWine.

References

External links

Buildings and structures in Warren County, Ohio
Casinos in Ohio
Sports venues in Ohio
Harness racing venues in the United States
Tourist attractions in Warren County, Ohio
Churchill Downs Incorporated
Horse racing venues in Ohio
Casinos completed in 2013